The neighborhoods in New York City are located within the five boroughs of the City of New York. Their names and borders are not officially defined, and they change from time to time.

Boroughs

New York City is split up into five boroughs: the Bronx, Brooklyn, Manhattan, Queens, and Staten Island. Each borough has the same boundaries as a county of the state. The county governments were dissolved when the city consolidated in 1898, along with all city, town, and village governments within each county. The term borough was adopted to describe a unique form of governmental administration for each of the five fundamental constituent parts of the newly consolidated city.

Neighborhoods by borough 

List of Bronx neighborhoods
List of Brooklyn neighborhoods
List of Manhattan neighborhoods
List of Queens neighborhoods
List of Staten Island neighborhoods

Community areas

See also

New York City ethnic enclaves

References

External links
NYCwiki, devoted to New York City's neighborhoods
Locksmith NYC